Freerunning is an athletic and acrobatic discipline incorporating an aesthetic element, and can be considered either a sport or a performance art, or both. Freerunning is similar to parkour, from which it is derived, but emphasizes artistry over efficiency and speed. Freerunning involves interacting with physical obstacles in creative ways, such as by climbing, jumping or running; the obstacles may be purpose-built or may be part of a pre-existing natural or man-made environment. The movements are usually adopted from other sports, such as gymnastics, tricking or breakdancing. Freerunners can create their own moves, flows and lines in different landscapes. Practitioners of freerunning usually do parkour as well. Freerunning was founded by Sebastien Foucan, who discussed the subject in 2003 documentary film Jump London.

Foucan developed freerunning as a more inclusive form of parkour. Parkour's efficient military style obstacle course training lends itself to martial art as a means of weapons avoidance and efficiently closing a distance to an opponent. Freerunning is derived from parkour, but it emphasizes not efficiency but artistry, allowing room for fancy flips and stylistic acrobatics.

Etymology
The word "freerunning" was first used in the documentary Jump London. The name was coined from a suggestion by Guillaume Pelletier, who was working with the group of practitioners at this time. In the documentary, freerunning was defined as an English translation of parkour.

Philosophy
The central principle of freerunning is that one should express oneself by moving fluidly in one's environment; there are no limitations on the form of this movement. Foucan expands on a number of basic principles of the sport in his book, Freerunning. Other practitioners have suggested other principles. For example, Daniel Ilabaca encourages people to think positively, suggesting that practitioners of freerunning will sometimes fall—largely because they think they might.

History

Origins in parkour

In Western Europe, the idea of moving past obstacles for personal development or sport originated with Georges Hébert. He observed untrained native tribes in Africa with fantastic athletic ability and created the 'natural method' system to train people using the same ideas. His ideas eventually led to the parcours du combattant ('obstacle course', literally 'assault course'), which is now a standard of military training.

These ideas were picked up by a young Raymond Belle, who used them to practical effect while separated from his family during the First Indochina War. When he moved to France and started a family, he passed on these ideas to his son, David. 30 years later, other young people were attracted to these ideas and a small group formed, the Yamakasi, which included Foucan. This group trained together for several years and in 1997, through David Belle's brother, Jean-Francois, they started to attract attention and be invited to perform at events. The Yamakasi eventually split apart, though, because some members sought to find more individual expressions of the discipline.

Meanwhile, action star Jackie Chan had also been heavily featuring the same concepts in most of his films ever since the early 1980s from the other side of the globe. Yamakasi cited him as an influence on parkour. They drew influence from Asian culture and Asian martial arts, notably the acrobatic antics of Jackie Chan in his Hong Kong action films, as well as the philosophy of Bruce Lee.

Further development
Foucan wanted to create a discipline that was more personal to the individual than parkour and more easily adapted to suit each person's individual goals. His idea was similar to that of Bruce Lee's creation of Jeet Kune Do. Foucan wanted to take everything that he had found useful and that he liked from his parkour experiences and combine it into one sport.

Foucan's early ideas were first spread through the Jump London documentary (2003) and its sequel, Jump Britain (2005). Foucan has appeared in other productions, such as Casino Royale and Madonna's Confessions Tour. With each appearance both the discipline and Foucan himself increased in fame.

International
In 2014, the BBC traveled to J&K
Kashmir to highlight the youth partaking in freerunning as a form of freedom of expression.

Injuries and deaths 

 2013 - Russia - A person attempted a backflip on the ledge of a roof of a 16 story building, but when attempting to land on the ledge, fell from the building and died. 

 16 August 2019 - Russia - It was reported that a person was "engaged in parkour on the roof" of a 9 story building and during a jump, fell off the roof and died from the fall.

See also
 Obstacle racing
Parkour

References

Parkour
Games and sports introduced in 2003